Phoebe Fawzy Girgis is a journalist, women's activist and politician who serves as Second Deputy Speaker of the Egyptian Senate. Winning office on the Republican People's Party ticket at the 2020 Egyptian Senate elections, she is the first Coptic woman to serve in the parliament.

References 

21st-century Egyptian women politicians
21st-century Egyptian politicians
Year of birth missing (living people)
Living people